Live is the eleventh album and the first live album by Alison Krauss and Union Station. All of the songs except "Down to the River to Pray" (performed at Austin City Limits) were recorded at The Louisville Palace on April 29–30, 2002. The album was released on November 5, 2002.

At the 46th Grammy Awards, Live won the Grammy Award for Best Bluegrass Album and the traditional song "Cluck Old Hen" won the Grammy Award for Best Country Instrumental Performance.

Track listing

Personnel
 Alison Krauss - Vocals, fiddle
 Jerry Douglas - Resonator guitar, vocals
 Dan Tyminski - Guitar, mandolin, vocals
 Ron Block - Guitar, banjo, vocals
 Barry Bales - Bass, vocals
 Larry Atamanuik - Drums

Chart performance

Weekly charts

Year-end charts

References

Alison Krauss & Union Station albums
2002 live albums
Rounder Records live albums
Austin City Limits
Grammy Award for Best Bluegrass Album
Albums recorded at the Louisville Palace